Foss Reservoir, also known as Foss Lake, is in Custer County, Oklahoma on the Washita River, about  west of Clinton, Oklahoma. The reservoir was constructed during 1958–1961 by the U. S. Bureau of Reclamation. The project was known originally as the Washita Basin Project. The primary purposes are to regulate flow of the river and to provide water for the cities of Bessie, Clinton, Cordell and Hobart. It is western Oklahoma's largest lake and lies entirely within Foss State Park.

Description

Foss Dam
Dam construction began in October, 1958.

Foss State Park
Foss State Park encompasses  of land and contains 8 campgrounds, swimming beach, 6 boat ramps, a playground, marina, and a restaurant. It also has  of equestrian and multi-use trails. Foss State Park is often mentioned as a target for sale or closure to help close the state's current budget deficit. Already the state has sold a herd of bison as "surplus property." The bison had recently been moved into Foss State Park from another location in western Oklahoma.

Water treatment
The water quality in Lake Foss is extremely hard. The Bureau of Reclamation built one of the first electrodialysis plants in the United States to process the water before it is delivered to users. The Oklahoma Department of Environmental Quality constructed a new, updated plant to replace the original in 2002. The new plant, built by Ionics, Inc., would also increase production of potable water for its municipal customers from 3 million to 4.5 million U.S. gallons per day.

References

Buildings and structures in Custer County, Oklahoma
Reservoirs in Oklahoma
Infrastructure completed in 1961
Bodies of water of Custer County, Oklahoma